In a Word: Yes (1969–) is the second box set by the English progressive rock band Yes, released in July 2002 by Rhino Records. The five-CD set includes tracks from the band's entire career between the years 1969 to 2001, including material by Anderson Bruford Wakeman Howe and previously unreleased tracks.

Background
The set includes a 100-page booklet contains a comprehensive history of the band by journalist Chris Welch and an essay by philosopher Bill Martin. It also includes a foreword from filmmaker Cameron Crowe and testimonials from King's X frontman/bassist Doug Pinnick, Primus frontman/bassist Les Claypool, Tool drummer Danny Carey, and Phish drummer Jon Fishman.

In October 2003, figures from Nielsen SoundScan showed that 14,000 copies of the box set had been sold in the United States.

Critical Reception

Stephen Thomas Erlewine of AllMusic gave the box set 4.5 stars out of five, pointing out that "the sound is better than YesYears" and that In a Word tells the story better. Therefore, he concluded that "if all you want is one comprehensive Yes album in your collection, this suits the bill". The editorial staff of Entertainment Weekly gave In a Word a B+, noting that "the MTV hits hold up, but nostalgists will prefer dusting off the old bong and settling in with the early epics".

Track listing

Personnel
Jon Anderson – lead vocals (all except 4.4 – 4.5)
Peter Banks – guitar, backing vocals (1.1 – 1.8)
Bill Bruford – drums (1.1 – 2.5, 3.1 – 3.2, 4.13 – 4.15)
Tony Kaye – keyboards (1.1 – 1.13, 4.6 – 4.12, 5.1 – 5.3)
Chris Squire – bass, backing vocals (all except 4.13 – 4.14)
Steve Howe – guitar, backing vocals (1.9 – 4.5, 4.13 – 4.15, 5.4 – 5.10)
Rick Wakeman – keyboards (2.1 – 3.2, 3.5 – 4.3, 4.13 – 4.15, 5.4)
Alan White – drums (2.6, 3.3 – 4.12, 5.1 – 5.10)
Patrick Moraz – keyboards (3.3 – 3.4)
Geoff Downes – keyboards (4.4 – 4.5)
Trevor Horn – lead vocals (4.4 – 4.5)
Trevor Rabin – guitar, backing vocals (4.6 – 4.12, 5.1 – 5.3)
Billy Sherwood – guitar, keyboards, backing vocals (5.5 – 5.8)
Igor Khoroshev – keyboards (5.7 – 5.8)

References

Albums with cover art by Roger Dean (artist)
Albums produced by Eddy Offord
Albums produced by Trevor Horn
Albums produced by Bruce Fairbairn
Albums produced by Jonathan Elias
Albums produced by Trevor Rabin
Albums produced by Billy Sherwood
Yes (band) compilation albums
2002 compilation albums
Rhino Records compilation albums